Ranjit Singh Narula (1908 – 1 June 2005) was a former Judge of the Supreme Court of India, and former Chief Justice of the Punjab & Haryana High Court from May 1974 to October 1977. He was the acting Governor of Punjab in September 1977. He was earlier the Governor of Haryana from March to September 1976.

Justice Narula Committee
In December 1993, the Delhi government under the Chief Ministership of Madan Lal Khurana of the BJP, set up a committee under Justice (retd.) R.S. Narula seeking its recommendations to "review the status" of the recommendations made by Potti-Rosha, Kapur-Mittal and Jain-Aggarwal commissions after the 1984 Anti-Sikh Riots. In its report submitted in January 1994, the Narula committee recommended registration of cases against H K L Bhagat, Sajjan Kumar, and Jagdish Tytler.

References 

Governors of Punjab, India
Governors of Haryana
Chief Justices of the Punjab and Haryana High Court
20th-century Indian judges
2005 deaths
1908 births